Kračali is a settlement in the hills west of Sodražica in southern Slovenia. It is included in the Southeast Slovenia Statistical Region. Traditionally the area around Sodražica was part of Lower Carniola. Together with the villages of Betonovo, Janeži, Petrinci, and Kržeti it comprises the community and Parish of Gora nad Sodražico, also known as Gora.

Mass graves
Kračali is the site of two known mass graves or unmarked graves associated with the Second World War. The Kračali 1 Grave, also known as the Pasture 1 Grave, is located north of the road west of the village. It contains the remains of undetermined victims. The Kračali 2 Grave, also known as the Pasture 2 Grave, is located south of the first grave. It contained the remains of an unknown person buried under a tree stump and has probably been exhumed.

References

External links
Kračali on Geopedia

Populated places in the Municipality of Sodražica